Duke Zhuang of Wey may refer to:

Duke Zhuang I of Wey (r. 757–735 BC), given name Yáng (揚)
Duke Zhuang II of Wey (r. 480–478 BC), given name Kuǎikùi (蒯聵)

Title and name disambiguation pages